Arces-Dilo is a commune in the Yonne department in Bourgogne-Franche-Comté in north-central France.

Sights
The commune of Arces Dilo was formed in 1977 by the union of the former communes of Arces and Dilo.

Arces
 The eighteenth-century church of Saint-Michel, with a Tuscan vault and a tower in the style of Soufflot. The patron saints of the church are St. Ebbon and St. Michel.
 The Cross of St. Ebbon
 The Well of St. Ebbon, formerly believed to be able to cure fevers

Dilo
(Deilocus "a place dedicated to God")

Dilo owes its origin to a Premonstratensian abbey (the Abbaye Notre-Dame de Dilo) founded in 1132 and enriched by many generous donations. The monks there developed an iron and steel works. During his exile in France to Pontigny, Thomas Becket (called St. Thomas of Canterbury) stayed at Dilo, where he consecrated the church in 1168.

The Chapel of Saint-Cartault, blessed and dedicated to worship in 1692, in the oldest parish church.

Personalities
 Odo of Villemaur
 Aelis Comtesse de Nevers (widow of the Comte de Joigny Renard IV). Buried in the abbey church of Dilo, his tomb is now in the church of Joigny.

See also
Communes of the Yonne department

References

Communes of Yonne